Tim Bradbury is a former judge of the King County Superior Court. Bradbury was the first openly gay judge appointed in the state of Washington.

Early life and education
Bradbury received a Juris Doctor from the University of Chicago Law School in 1972.

Judicial service
On September 22, 1995, Washington Governor Mike Lowry selected Bradbury to replace retiring judge Arthur Piehler on the King County Superior Court. Bradbury joined the bench on October 10, 1995, but less than a month later lost the election to determine who would fill out the remainder of Piehler's term.

See also 
 List of LGBT jurists in the United States

References

Living people
University of Chicago Law School alumni
LGBT judges
Washington (state) state court judges
Year of birth missing (living people)
LGBT appointed officials in the United States
20th-century American judges
American gay men